William Carl Placher (1948–2008) was an American postliberal theologian. He was Follette Distinguished Professor in the Humanities at Wabash College until his death in 2008. He was a leader at Wabash Avenue Presbyterian Church.

Publications

Readings in the History of Christianity, Volume 1, Westminster Press, 1988.
The Domestication of Transcendence: How Modern Thinking about God Went Wrong, Westminster John Knox Press, 1996. 
Jesus the Savior: The Meaning of Jesus Christ for Christian Faith, Westminster John Knox Press, 2001.

References

1948 births
2008 deaths
20th-century American theologians
20th-century Calvinist and Reformed theologians
American Calvinist and Reformed theologians
American Presbyterians
Presbyterian Church (USA)
Wabash College faculty